Wilcze may refer to the following places:
Wilcze, Greater Poland Voivodeship (west-central Poland)
Wilcze, Kuyavian-Pomeranian Voivodeship (north-central Poland)
Wilcze, Gmina Osielsko in Kuyavian-Pomeranian Voivodeship (north-central Poland)
Wilcze, Warmian-Masurian Voivodeship (north Poland)
Wilcze, Gmina Chojna in West Pomeranian Voivodeship (north-west Poland)
Wilcze, Gmina Widuchowa in West Pomeranian Voivodeship (north-west Poland)